This list of Ramsar sites in Mexico includes wetlands that are considered to be of international importance under the Ramsar Convention. For a full list of all Ramsar sites worldwide, see List of Ramsar wetlands of international importance.

List of Ramsar sites

See also
 Ramsar Convention
 List of Ramsar sites worldwide

References



 
Mexico